The Chennai Central–Coimbatore Shatabdi Express was a Shatabdi Express train between  and  in Tamil Nadu.

History 
The Shatabdi Express which was running from 1995 and 2000 was stopped because it had occupancy of 60 percent as cited by Railways, It was replaced with an Intercity Express departing at identical timings. Later, Indian railways introduced a Duronto Express between Chennai and Coimbatore in 2011. It was decided to convert back to Shatabdi and add additional stoppages to increase revenues.

Rake composition & coaches 
The 12243/44 MGR Chennai Central–Coimbatore Junction Shatabdi Express presently has 1 Executive class, 7 AC chair car and 2 end-on generator coaches. The train runs with modern LHB coaches.

The coaches in Light blue color indicate AC Chair Cars and the coaches in Violet color indicate Executive Chair Car.

Route and stations 

See also
 Cheran Superfast Express
 Kovai Express
 Nilgiri Express
 Southern Railway zone
 Indian Railways

Notes

References

Shatabdi Express trains
Rail transport in Tamil Nadu
Transport in Coimbatore
Transport in Chennai